Sanandaj (Persian: سنندج, ; , often romanized as Senneh, is the capital of Kurdistan Province in Iran. With a population of 414,069, Sanandaj is the twenty third largest city in Iran and the second largest Kurdish city. Sanandaj's founding is fairly recent, (about 250 years ago), yet under its short existence it has grown to become one of the centers of Kurdish culture.  During the Iraq-Iran War the city was attacked by Iraqi planes and saw disturbances. From 2019 UNESCO has recognized Sineh (Sanandaj) as Creative City of Music. The city is located between the Qishlaq river, a tributary of the Diyala, and Mount Awidar, which separates it from the old Ardalan capital of Hasanabad. Carpet making is the biggest industry in Sanandaj.

History 
The name "Sinna" first appears in records from the 14th century CE. Before this, the main city in the region was Sisar, whose exact location is unknown. Sisar was also called "Sisar of Sadkhaniya", or "Sisar of the hundred springs", and it has been proposed that the current name of "Sinna" is a contracted form of "Sadkhaniya".

The name "Sisar" disappears in the 14th century and the name "Sinna" replaces it, for example in the works of Hamdallah Mustawfi who refers to a mountain and a pass with this name. Then the Kurdish historian Sharaf al-Din Bitlisi mentions that in 1580 an Ardalan ruler named Timur Khan had a land grant including Sinna and the earlier Ardalan capital of Hasanabad. However, the local historian Ali-Akbar Munshi Waqayi-Nigar wrote in 1892/3 that Sinna was founded later, by the ruler Soleyman Khan Ardalan, on the site of an earlier settlement; the chronogram he gives for this event corresponds to 1046 AH, or 1636-7 CE. Sinna was developed significantly under the reign of Aman Allah "the Great" (from 1797-1825). 19th-century Sinna was "a lively commercial center, exporting oak galls, tragacanth, furs, and carpets". Its population was mostly Kurdish, with a significant Jewish minority and smaller numbers of Armenian and Chaldean Catholic Christians.

People 
The population of Sanandaj is mainly Kurdish. The city also had an Armenian minority who gradually emigrated from the city. Until the Iranian Revolution (1979), the city had a small Aramaic-speaking Jewish community of about 4,000 people. The city boasted a sizable Assyrian community that spoke a unique dialect of Aramaic called Senaya, they are mostly members of the Chaldean Catholic Church. The economy of Sanandaj is based upon the production of carpets, processed hides and skins, milled rice, refined sugar, woodworking, cotton weaving, metalware and cutlery.

Most of the people of Sanandaj follow the Shafi‘i branch of Sunni Islam.

Language 
The linguistic composition of the city:

Climate

Sanandaj has a humid continental climate (Dsa) according to the Köppen climate classification with cold and wet winters and hot and dry summers.

References

Sources

External links

 Sanandaj
 Sanandaj Online Community
  Islamic Azad University of sanandaj

Towns and villages in Sanandaj County
Iranian provincial capitals
Cities in Kurdistan Province
Assyrian settlements
Kurdish settlements in Kurdistan Province